John William Croft (20 January 1871 – ) was an Australian politician. Born in Newcastle, New South Wales, he was educated in state schools before becoming an apprentice bootmaker. Moving to Western Australia in the 1890s, he was Secretary of the Coastal Trades and Labour Council. In 1903, he was elected to the Australian Senate as a Labor Senator for Western Australia. He retired in 1910.

The circumstances surrounding Croft's death are unclear, and no death certificate registered for him has been located in Australia. Members of his family have variously recorded that he disappeared after heading off on a mysterious "mission" to Uruguay in 1913, but that he attended his mother's funeral in 1925 and was not listed as deceased on his father's 1929 death certificate. Another theory was that Croft committed suicide and this was covered up.

References

1871 births
Year of death unknown
Australian Labor Party members of the Parliament of Australia
Members of the Australian Senate for Western Australia
Members of the Australian Senate
20th-century Australian politicians